Soft Dangerous Shores is the twelfth album by singer-songwriter and guitarist, Chris Whitley. It is his tenth studio album.

Malcolm Burn produced, mixed, and played on the album. It was recorded by Burn in Kingston, New York.

Track listing
All tracks written by Chris Whitley.

 "Fireroad (for Two)" – 3:26
 "Soft Dangerous Shores" – 4:10
 "As Day is Long" – 3:30
 "Valley of the Innocents" – 3:28
 "City of Women" – 6:36
 "Times Square Machine (N.Y.C. February 1991)" – 0:54
 "Her Furious Angels" – 3:11
 "Last Million Miles" – 4:21
 "Medicine Wheel" – 4:33
 "End Game Holiday" – 4:22
 "Breath of Shadows" – 3:53
 [unnamed] – 0:18

Personnel 
Chris Whitley – vocals, guitars, and banjo
Heiko Schramm – bass guitars
Matthias Macht – drums and percussion
Malcolm Burn – keyboards, programming, and processing

Additional personnel
Trixie Whitley – vocals (9)
Dan Whitley – guitar (1, 2)
Aaron Comess – drums (8)

References

2005 albums
Chris Whitley albums
Albums produced by Malcolm Burn
Messenger Records albums